In mathematics, an elementary proof is a mathematical proof that only uses basic techniques. More specifically, the term is used in number theory to refer to proofs that make no use of complex analysis. Historically, it was once thought that certain theorems, like the prime number theorem, could only be proved by invoking "higher" mathematical theorems or techniques. However, as time progresses, many of these results have also been subsequently reproven using only elementary techniques.

While there is generally no consensus as to what counts as elementary, the term is nevertheless a common part of the mathematical jargon. An elementary proof is not necessarily simple, in the sense of being easy to understand or trivial. In fact, some elementary proofs can be quite complicated — and this is especially true when a statement of notable importance is involved.

Prime number theorem

The distinction between elementary and non-elementary proofs has been considered especially important in regard to the prime number theorem. This theorem was first proved in 1896 by Jacques Hadamard and Charles Jean de la Vallée-Poussin using complex analysis. Many mathematicians then attempted to construct elementary proofs of the theorem, without success. G. H. Hardy expressed strong reservations; he considered that the essential "depth" of the result ruled out elementary proofs:

However, in 1948, Atle Selberg produced new methods which led him and Paul Erdős to find elementary proofs of the prime number theorem. 

A possible formalization of the notion of "elementary" in connection to a proof of a number-theoretical result is the restriction that the proof can be carried out in Peano arithmetic. Also in that sense, these proofs are elementary.

Friedman's conjecture

Harvey Friedman conjectured, "Every theorem published in the Annals of Mathematics whose statement involves only finitary mathematical objects (i.e., what logicians call an arithmetical statement) can be proved in elementary arithmetic." The form of elementary arithmetic referred to in this conjecture can be formalized by a small set of axioms concerning integer arithmetic and mathematical induction. For instance, according to this conjecture, Fermat's Last Theorem should have an elementary proof; Wiles's proof of Fermat's Last Theorem is not elementary. However, there are other simple statements about arithmetic such as the existence of iterated exponential functions that cannot be proven in this theory.

References

Elementary mathematics
Mathematical proofs